The Politburo of the Lao People's Revolutionary Party (LPRP) is the highest decision-making organ when the Central Committee is not convened for a plenary session.

History
The Politburo of the Central Committee was established at the 2nd LPRP National Congress, held on 3–6 February 1972. Seven members were elected to the first Politburo, known as the 2nd Politburo. Of these seven members four concurrently served as members of the 2nd Secretariat.

Pany Yathotou became the first woman and first of Hmong ethnicity to be elected to the Politburo (she was elected in 2006 to the 8th Politburo). Women representation on the Politburo increased during the 11th term of the Central Committee, when both Yathotou and Sisay Leudetmounsone were elected to the 11th Politburo.

Terms

See also
 Lao People's Revolutionary Party
 Central Committee of the Lao People's Revolutionary Party
 Secretariat of the Lao People's Revolutionary Party

References

Bibliography 
Books:
 

Politburo of the Lao People's Revolutionary Party
1972 establishments in Laos